Giraffe, Erdmännchen & Co. is a German television series.

External links
 

Television series about mammals
2006 German television series debuts
2010s German television series
German-language television shows
Television shows set in Frankfurt
Das Erste original programming